Building transportation systems include: 

 Elevator
 Escalator
 Moving walkway
 Paternoster elevator

References

Building engineering